Eagle Guardian is a NATO regional defence scheme drawn up before 2010 to defend the Baltic states and Poland against an attack by Russia.

The plan identifies ports in Poland and Germany to receive naval assault forces, as well as British and US warships. Nine NATO divisions from the US, UK, Germany and Poland should carry out combat operations according to Article 5 of the NATO Charter in case of an armed aggression against the Baltic states or Poland.

U.S. Mission to NATO documents that mention Eagle Guardian include:
09USNATO588, DEMARCHE DELIVERED ON NATO CONTINGENCY PLANNING, 16 December 2009
09WARSAW1228, Poland could accept "Complementary" contingency, 18 December 2009
09USNATO532, Lithuanian MOD Discusses NATO contingency planning, 19 November 2009
10USNATO11, Polish Non-Paper on Baltic contingency planning, 11 January 2010
10USNATO35, NATO agrees to do contingency planning for the Baltic States
10STATE 007810

An associated operations plan is 'Constant Guardian.' (10USNATO11)

References

External links
 NATO including Basic NATO Documents

History of the Baltic states
Eagle Guardian